The following is a list of the recordings of the pianist György Cziffra.

In addition to those, there are many non-commercial recordings freely circulating online
There are also several releases by the small label Zenith Classical, featuring items from private collections, never-before-available in any format.

Studio recordings (audio)

Johann Sebastian Bach
 Bach/Busoni: Chorale Prelude, BWV 645 (EMI)
 Bach/Busoni: Das Orgel-Büchlein – In dir ist Freude, BWV 615 & Erschienen ist der herrliche Tag, BWV 629 (EMI)
 Bach/Busoni: Prelude and Fugue, BWV 532 (1968 & 1981 EMI)
 Toccata and Fugue, BWV 565 (EMI)

CPE Bach
 Sonata, H.245 (ICA, EMI)

Mily Balakirev
 Islamey, Op.18 (1956 & 1970 EMI, Hungaroton)

Ludwig van Beethoven
 Für Elise, WoO 59 (EMI)
 Piano Sonata, Op.13 (EMI)
 Piano Sonata, Op.14 No.2 (EMI)
 Piano Sonata, Op.26 (EMI)
 Piano Sonata, Op.27 No.1 (EMI)
 Piano Sonata, Op.53 (EMI)
 Piano Sonata, Op.54 (EMI)
 Piano Sonata, Op.57 (EMI)
 Polonaise, Op.89 (EMI)
 Rondo a capriccio, Op.129 (EMI)
 Variations on 'God Save the King', WoO 78 (EMI)
 Variations on the Russian Dance from the Ballet 'Das Waldmädchen', WoO 71 (EMI)
 Variations, WoO 80 (EMI)

Georges Bizet
 Bizet/Rachmaninoff: L'Arlésienne – Acte II – Deuxième Tableau – Intermezzo (Minuetto) (EMI)

Johannes Brahms
 Brahms/Cziffra: Hungarian Dances (Nos. 1–17, 19, 21), WoO 1 (EMI)
 Variations on a Theme by Paganini – Heft I & Heft II, Op.35 (EMI)
 Waltz, Op.39 No.15 (EMI)

Frédéric Chopin
 Andante spianato et Grande polonaise brillante, Op.22 (Philips) with Manuel Rosenthal
 Ballade, Op.52 (EMI, Philips)
 Barcarolle, Op.60 (EMI)
 Berceuse, Op.57 (Philips)
 Bolero, Op.19 (EMI)
 Etudes, Op.10 (Philips)
 Etude No.3, Op.10 (1958 & 1974 & 1981 EMI)
 Etudes (Nos. 4, 5, 12), Op.10 (EMI)
 Etude No.10, Op.10 (1974 & 1981 EMI)
 Etudes, Op.25 (Philips)
 Etude No.1, Op.25 (1974 & 1974 EMI)
 Etude No.2, Op.25 (EMI)
 Fantaisie-Impromptu, Op.66 (1974 & 1974–1975 EMI)
 Fantaisie, Op.49 (EMI)
 Impromptu, Op.29 (1968 & 1974 & 1974–1975 EMI)
 Impromptu, Op.36 (1974 & 1974–1975 EMI)
 Impromptu, Op.51 (Philips, EMI)
 Krakowiak, Op.14 (EMI) with Georges Cziffra Jr.
 Nocturne, Op.9 (EMI)
 Nocturne, Op.9 No.2 (EMI)
 Nocturne, Op.27 No.2 (Philips)
 Piano Concerto, Op.11 (Philips, 1968 & 1976 EMI) with Georges Cziffra Jr., Manuel Rosenthal
 Piano Sonata, Op.35 (Philips, EMI)
 Piano Sonata, Op.58 (EMI)
 Polonaise-fantaisie, Op.61 (EMI)
 Polonaise, Op.26 (Philips)
 Polonaise, Op.40 (Philips, EMI)
 Polonaise, Op.40 No.1 (EMI)
 Polonaise, Op.44 (Philips, EMI)
 Polonaise, Op.53 (Philips, EMI)
 Prelude, Op.28 No.16 (EMI)
 Scherzo, Op.31 (Philips, EMI)
 Variations brillantes, Op.12 (EMI)
 Waltz, B.21 (EMI)
 Waltz, B.44 (EMI)
 Waltz, B.46 (EMI)
 Waltz, B.56 (Philips, EMI)
 Waltz, B.133 (EMI)
 Waltz, B.150 (EMI)
 Waltz, Op.18 (Philips, EMI)
 Waltz, Op.34 (Philips, EMI)
 Waltz, Op.42 (Philips, EMI)
 Waltz, Op.64 (Philips, EMI)
 Waltz, Op.64 No.1 (EMI)
 Waltz, Op.64 No.2 (EMI)
 Waltz, Op.69 (Philips, EMI)
 Waltz, Op.70 (Philips, EMI)

François Couperin
 Pièces de clavecin – Book 1 : Ordre II No.23 & Ordre V No.8 (EMI)
 Pièces de clavecin – Book 2 : Ordre VI – No.1(1969 & 1981 EMI, ICA)
 Pièces de clavecin – Book 2 : Ordre VI – No.5 (EMI)
 Pièces de clavecin – Book 3 : Ordre XIII No.10-11 (EMI)
 Pièces de clavecin – Book 3 : Ordre XVIII No.6 (1956 & 1981 EMI)
 Pièces de clavecin – Book 4 : Ordre XVII No.2 & Ordre XXII No.5 (EMI)

György Cziffra 
 Fantaisie roumaine (EMI, Hungaroton)
 Improvisation sur des themes de Gulliaume tell (EMI)
 Reminiscences de Johann Strauss (1956 & 1956 EMI)

Louis-Claude Daquin
 Pièces de Clavecin – Second Livre : L'Hirondelle (EMI)
 Pièces de Clavecin – Troisième Livre : Le Coucou (1956 & 1981 EMI)

Claude Debussy
 Clair De Lune (EMI)
 La plus que lente (EMI)
 Pour le piano (EMI)
 Preludes, Vol.1 No.8 (EMI)

Ernő Dohnányi
 Konzertetüde, Op.28 No.6 (EMI)

Manuel de Falla
 Falla/Cziffra: El amor brujo(revised) – No.8 Danse Rituelle du Feu (EMI)

John Field
 Piano Sonata, Op.1 No.1 – 2nd movement (Hungaroton)

César Franck
 Prélude, Choral et Fugue (EMI)
 Variations symphoniques (1961 & 1969 EMI) with André Vandernoot, Georges Cziffra Jr.

George Gershwin
 Rhapsody in Blue (Hungaroton) with Zoltán Rozsnyai

Charles Gounod
 Gounod/Liszt: Faust – Act 2 : Waltz (EMI)

Edvard Grieg
 Lyric Piece, Op.43 No.1 (EMI)
 Piano Concerto, Op.16 (1958 & 1969 EMI, Hungaroton) with Georges Cziffra Jr., André Vandernoot, Zoltán Rozsnyai

Johann Nepomuk Hummel
 Rondo, Op.11 (1956–1957 & 1969 EMI, Hungaroton)

Aram Khachaturian
 Gayane – Danse du sabre (1956 & 1956 & 1956 EMI, Hungaroton)

Johann Ludwig Krebs
 Bourrée

Franz Liszt
 Tarantelle di bravura d’après la tarantelle de La muette de Portici, S.386 No.1 (EMI, Hungaroton)
 Polish Songs (Nos. 1, 5), S.480 (EMI)
 Le rossignol, S.250 No.1 (EMI)
 Liszt/Cziffra: Hungarian Rhapsody No. 16  S.244(EMI)
 Liszt/Cziffra: Hungarian Rhapsody No. 19 S.244 (EMI, Hungaroton)
 Ballade, S.171 (EMI)
 Concert Etudes, S.144 No.2 & No.3 (Philips)
 Concert Etudes, S.145 (EMI, Hungaroton)
 Fantasie über ungarische Volksmelodien, S.123 (1957 & 1964 & 1968 EMI) with André Vandernoot, Georges Cziffra Jr., Pierre Dervaux
 Gaudeaums Igitur, S.509 (EMI)
 Grand galop chromatique (EMI)
 Grandes études de Paganini, S.141 No.3 La Campanella (1959 & 1975 EMI)
 Grandes études de Paganini, S.141 No.5 La Chasse (EMI)
 Harmonies poétiques et religieuses III, S.173 – No.7 (EMI)
 Hungarian Rhapsodies (Nos. 2, 6, 12, 15), S.244 (Hungaroton)
 Hungarian Rhapsodies (Nos. 1, 3–5, 7–11, 13–14), S.244 (EMI)
 Hungarian Rhapsodies (Nos. 1–15), S.244 (EMI)
 Hungarian Rhapsody, S.244 – No.2 (ICA)
 Legend, S.175 No.1 (EMI)
 Legend, S.175 No.2 (EMI, Philips)
 Liebesträume, S.541 – No.3 (1957 & 1977 EMI)
 Mephisto Waltz, S.541 (1957 & 1985–1986 EMI)
 Piano Concerto, S.124 (1957 & 1961 & 1969 EMI, Hungaroton) with André Vandernoot, Georges Cziffra Jr., Gyorgy Lehel, Pierre Dervaux
 Piano Concerto, S.125 (1958 & 1969 EMI) with André Vandernoot, Georges Cziffra Jr.
 Piano Sonata, S.178
 Polonaise, S.223 – No.1 (EMI)
 Polonaise, S.223 – No.2 (Philips, EMI)
 Rhapsodie espagnole, S.254 (EMI)
 Soirées de Vienne, S.427 – No.6 (EMI, Hungaroton)
 Totentanz, S.126 (1964 & 1968 EMI) with André Vandernoot, Georges Cziffra Jr.
 Transcendental Etudes (Nos. 1–11), S.139 (Hungaroton)
 Transcendental Etudes, S.139 (EMI)
 Transcendental Etude, S.139 – No.9 (EMI)
 Transcendental Etude, S.139 – No.10 (1956 & 1981 EMI)
 Trascendental Etude, S.139 – No.12 (EMI)
 Valse-Impromptu, S.213 (1956 & 1957 & 1977–1978 & 1985–1986 EMI, Hungaroton)
 Valses oubliées, S.215 – No.1 (1957 & 1977–1978 EMI, Hungaroton)
 Années de pèlerinage I, S.160 (EMI)
 Années de pèlerinage II, S.161 (EMI)
 Années de pèlerinage II, S.161 – No.6 (Philips)
 Années de pèlerinage II, Supplément, S.162 (EMI)
 Années de pèlerinage II, Supplément, S.162 – No.3 Tarantella (Philips)
 Années de pèlerinage III, S.163 (EMI)
 Années de pèlerinage III, S.163 – 4 (EMI)
 Konzertparaphrase über Mendelssohns Hochzeitsmarsch und Elfenreigen aus der Musik zu Shakespeares Sommernachtstraum, S.410 (EMI, Hungaroton)
 Ouvertüre zu Tannhäuser, S.442 (EMI, Hungaroton)
 Paraphrase de concert sur Rigoletto, S.434 (EMI, Hungaroton)
 Präludium und Fuge über den Namen BACH, S.529 No.2 (Philips)

Jean-Baptiste Lully
 Gavotte (1956 & 1969 & 1981 EMI)

Felix Mendelssohn
 Mendelssohn/Rachmaninoff: A Midsummer Night's Dream, Op.61 – No.1 (EMI)
 Lieder ohne Worte, Op.62 – No.6 (EMI)
 Lieder ohne Worte, Op.67 – No.4 (EMI)
 Piano Concerto, Op.25 (EMI) with Georges Cziffra Jr.
 Rondo Capriccioso, Op.14 (1968 & 1968 EMI)
 Fantaisie, Op.16 – No.2 Scherzo (EMI)

Wolfgang Amadeus Mozart
 Piano Sonata, K.310 (EMI)
 Piano Sonata, K.311 – 3rd movement (EMI)

Sergei Rachmaninoff
 Piano Concerto, Op.18 (EMI) with Georges Cziffra Jr.
 Prelude, Op.23 – No.5 (EMI)

Jean-Philippe Rameau
 Dardanus – Rigaudon (1969 & 1981 EMI)
 Nouvelles suites de pièces de clavecin – No.12 & No.16 (EMI)
 Pièces de clavecin – Suite II No.4 (EMI)
 Pièces de clavecin – Suite II No.7 (1959 & 1981 EMI)

Maurice Ravel
 Jeux d'eau (EMI)
 Le tombeau de Couperin – No.6 (EMI)
 Sonatine (EMI)

Nikolai Rimsky-Korsakov
 Rimsky-Korsakov/Cziffra: The Tale of Tsar Saltan – Act III Flight of the Bumblebee (1956 & 1956 EMI, Hungaroton)

Gioachino Rossini
 Rossini/Cziffra: La Danza (EMI)

Camille Saint-Saëns
 Étude, Op.52 – No.6 (EMI)

Domenico Scarlatti
 Keyboard Sonata, K.96 (EMI)
 Keyboard Sonata, K.101 (EMI)
 Keyboard Sonata, K.159 (1956 & 1969 EMI)

Franz Schubert
 Schubert/Tausig: Marché militaires, D.733 – No.1
 Impromptu, D.899 – No.4 (1969 & 1981 EMI)
 Impromptu, D.935 – No.1 (EMI)

Robert Schumann
 Carnaval, Op.9 (1957 & 1968 EMI)
 Fantasiestücke, Op.12 (EMI)
 Fantasiestücke, Op.12 – No.1 (EMI)
 Fantasiestücke, Op.12 – No.7 (Hungaroton)
 Faschingsschwank aus Wien, Op.26 (EMI)
 Kinderszenen, Op.15 – No.7 (EMI)
 Novellette, Op.21 – No.8 (EMI)
 Symphonic Etudes, Op.13 (EMI)
 Toccata, Op.7 (EMI)

Johann Strauss II
 Strauss/Cziffra: An der schönen blauen Donau (Hungaroton)
 Strauss/Cziffra: Der Zigeunerbaron (Hungaroton)
 Strauss/Cziffra: Die Fledermaus (Hungaroton)
 Strauss/Cziffra: Le beau Danube bleu (EMI)
 Strauss/Cziffra: Tritsch-Tratsch Polka (Hungaroton, EMI)

Pyotr Ilyich Tchaikovsky
 Tchaikovsky/Liszt: Eugene Onegin, Op.24 – Act III No.19 (EMI)
 Piano Concerto, Op.23 (1956 & 1957 EMI)

Giuseppe Verdi
 Verdi/Cziffra: Il trovatore (Hungaroton)

Franz von Vecsey
 Vecsey/Cziffra: Valse triste (EMI, Hungaroton)

Carl Maria von Weber
 Konzertstück, Op.79 (EMI) with Georges Cziffra Jr.

Live recordings (Audio)

Liszt
 Concert Etudes, S.145 No.2 (Aura Music, Archipel)
 Fantasie über ungarische Volksmelodien, S.123 (ICA) with André Cluytens
 Grand galop chromatique (Ermitage, Hungaroton, Medici Masters)
 Harmonies poétiques et religieuses III, S.173 – No.7 (ICA, Aura Music)
 Hungarian Rhapsody, S.244 – No.2 (Aura Music)
 Hungarian Rhapsody, S.244 – No.6 (Medici Masters, Ermitage)
 Liebesträume, S.541 – No.3 (Aura Music, Ermitage)
 Piano Concerto, S.124 (ICA, Archipel) with André Cluytens, Fulvio Vernizzi
 Piano Concerto, S.125 (Archipel) with Bernard Conz
 Polonaise, S.223 – No.2 (Medici Masters, Ermitage)
 Präludium und Fuge über den Namen BACH, S.529 No.2 (ICA)
 Rhapsodie espagnole, S.254 (ICA, Medici Masters, Ermitage)
 Totentanz, S.126 (IDIS) with Umberto Cattini
 Transcendental Etude, S.139 – No.5 (Archipel)
 Transcendental Etude, S.139 – No.10 (Aura Music, Archipel)
 Valse-Impromptu, S.213 (Ermitage)
 Années de pèlerinage II, S.161 – No.7 (Archipel)
 Années de pèlerinage III, S.163 – 4 (Archipel)

Bach
 Bach/Busoni: Prelude and Fugue, BWV 532 (Ermitage)

Bartók
 Piano Concerto, Sz.95 (EMI) with Mario Rossi

Beethoven
 Piano Sonata, Op.53 (Ermitage)

Chopin
 Ballade, Op.52 (Medici Masters, Aura Music)
 Etudes (Nos. 3, 10, 12), Op.10 (Aura Music)
 Etude No.1, Op.25 (Aura Music)
 Fantaisie-Impromptu, Op.66 (Aura Music)
 Fantaisie, Op.49 (Medici Masters, Ermitage)
 Impromptu, Op.51 (Medici Masters)
 Piano Concerto, Op.11 (claves) with Georges Cziffra Jr.
 Piano Sonata, Op.35 (Ermitage)
 Polonaise, Op.26 No.2 (Ermitage)
 Polonaise, Op.53 (Medici Masters, Ermitage)
 Scherzo, Op.31 (Medici Masters, Ermitage)
 Waltz, Op.18 (Medici Masters)
 Waltz, Op.34 No.3 (Medici Masters)
 Waltz, Op.42 (Aura Music)
 Waltz, Op.64 No.1 (Aura Music)
 Waltz, Op.64 No.2 (Aura Music)

Grieg
 Piano Concerto, Op.16 (ICA) with Georges Tzipine

Lully
 Gavotte (ICA)

Scarlatti
 Keyboard Sonata, K.96 & K.159 & K.284 & K.446 & K.533 (ICA)

Schumann
 Carnaval, Op.9 (Ermitage)

Discographies of classical pianists
Discographies of Hungarian artists
Discographies of French artists